Yuriy Hryhorovych Koval (born 29 April 1958) is a Ukrainian professional football coach and former player.

On 21 January 2010, Koval was appointed as new the Director of sport for club Zorya Luhansk in Ukrainian Premier League.

References

External links
  
 

1958 births
People from Dilijan
Living people
Armenian people of Ukrainian descent
Armenian emigrants to Ukraine
Soviet footballers
Ukrainian footballers
Ukrainian football managers
FC Oleksandriya managers
FC Nyva Vinnytsia managers
FC Kryvbas Kryvyi Rih managers
FC Khimik Severodonetsk managers
FC Kremin Kremenchuk managers
FC Zirka Kropyvnytskyi managers
FC Zorya Luhansk managers
FC Nyva Ternopil managers
Ukrainian Premier League managers
Ukrainian First League managers
Ukrainian Second League managers
Association football midfielders